Xenotaenia resolanae, the leopard splitfin, is a species of splitfin endemic to west–central Mexico where it is found in the Purificación and Marabasco River basins in Jalisco and Colima.  This species grows to a length of  TL.  It is found in the aquarium trade and is the only known species in its genus.

References
 

Goodeinae
Fish described in 1946
Freshwater fish of Mexico
Endemic fish of Mexico